The Ministry of Health is the Moroccan Ministry in charge of implementing government policies related to citizens' health. It was established on 1955 during the establishment of the first Moroccan government after independence.

Ministry
Like other Moroccan ministries, the Ministry of Health consists of a central administration located in the capital Rabat and regional administrations distributed all over the national territory.

List of ministers
Hocein Wardi (3 January 2007 – 22 January 2018)
Anass Doukali (22 January 2018 – 9 October 2019)
Khalid Aït Taleb (9 October 2019 – 7 October 2021)
Nabila Rmili (7 October 2021 – 14 October 2021)
Khalid Aït Taleb (14 October 2021 – present)

References

Health in Morocco
Morocco